The Ward River is a river located in Far North Queensland, Australia.

Four tributaries contribute to the Ward; Coconut Creek, Tappelbang Creek, Sandy Creek and Possum Creek.

The river is located within the Watson River catchment and in 2009 the river was considered for nomination as a wild river.

See also

References

Rivers of Far North Queensland
Gulf of Carpentaria